Xiao Zisheng (22 August 1894 - 21 November 1976) was a Chinese educator and scholar.

Names
His birthname was Xiao Zisheng. His style name was Xudong and his pseudonym was Shutong.

Biography
Xiao was born in Xiangxiang, Hunan on 22 August 1894, the elder son of Xiao Yueying, a Chinese educator.  He had a younger brother, Xiao San. In 1910, he attended Dongshan Higher Elementary School. In 1909, he enrolled in the Dongshan High School and graduated in 1911, where he studied alongside Mao Zedong and Xiao San. At that school, his father was the physics teacher. In 1911, he was accepted to Hunan First Normal University and graduated in 1915. He studied under Yang Changji. After college, he taught at Chuyi School. In 1918, he founded New People's Study Society with Mao Zedong. In 1919, he traveled to France for the Work-Study Program, becoming the secretary of China-France Education Association. He returned to China in 1924, and served in various posts in universities and colleges in Beijing. From 1931 to 1945, during the Second Sino-Japanese War, he lived in France to escape the violence. He once served as President of China International Library.

In 1949, he went to Taiwan, then moved to France and Switzerland. In 1952, he settled in Uruguay. On the 21st November 1976, he died.

Bibliography
 Mao Tse-Tung and I Were Beggars (1959)
 Biography of Mao Zedong and Me

References

1894 births
People from Xiangxiang
1976 deaths
Hunan First Normal University alumni
Educators from Hunan